Anežka Drahotová (born 22 July 1995, Rumburk) is a Czech athletics competitor in racewalking, middle-distance running, and steeplechase, as well an international-level cyclist. She is the Czech record holder for the 20 kilometres walk (1:29:05 – equal with Barbora Dibelková) and the 10 km track walk (44:15.87 minutes).

In her first major international competitions, she placed seventh in the junior category at the 2011 European Race Walking Cup and sixth in the 5000 m walk at the 2011 World Youth Championships in Athletics. The following year she ranked sixth in the 10 km walk at the 2012 World Junior Championships in Athletics, where she also placed 25th overall in the 1500 metres. The 2013 European Race Walking Cup saw her take the bronze medal in the 10 km walk event. She won the 20 km walk gold medal in the 2013 European Athletics Junior Championships, while her twin sister Eliška Drahotová took the bronze. In an unusual event combination, she also entered the 3000 metres steeplechase and placed ninth.

She placed outside the medals, taking seventh place, in the 2013 World Championships in Athletics held in Moscow in the 20 km walk despite leading the race for some kilometers and notching a personal best time of 1:29:05. She proved adept at running by finishing as the first Czech athlete at the Prague Grand Prix 10K run that year. Her global debut in cycling also came that year at the 2013 UCI Road World Championships. There she placed 19th in the junior road race. In 2013 her world ranking in the women's 20 km walk was 21st place overall.

She competed at the 2016 Summer Olympics in the women's 20 km walk event.

Competition record in athletics

References

External links
 

1995 births
Living people
People from Rumburk
Czech female racewalkers
Czech female steeplechase runners
Czech female cyclists
Olympic athletes of the Czech Republic
Athletes (track and field) at the 2016 Summer Olympics
World Athletics Championships athletes for the Czech Republic
European Athletics Championships medalists
Twin sportspeople
Czech twins
Czech Athletics Championships winners
Universiade bronze medalists for the Czech Republic
Universiade medalists in athletics (track and field)
Medalists at the 2019 Summer Universiade
Sportspeople from the Ústí nad Labem Region